A43 or A-43 may refer to:

Military
 Curtiss A-43 Blackhawk, an American prototype aircraft
 Douglas A-43 Jetmaster,  an American prototype aircraft
 Black Prince (tank), an experimental British heavy tank

 Advanced Landing Ground A-43, an airfield in France

Roads
 A43 road, a primary road in the English Midlands
 A43 road (Northern Ireland), a primary road in Northern Ireland
 A43 autoroute, a French highway
 A 43, Bundesautobahn 43 in Germany

Other uses
 HLA-A43, an HLA-A serotype
 Benoni Defense, a chess opening (by Encyclopaedia of Chess Openings code)